Daniel James Young (born 4 October 1988) is an Australian politician. He was a Shooters, Fishers and Farmers Party member of the Victorian Legislative Council, representing the Northern Victoria Region from 2014 to 2018.

Following his parliamentary defeat, Young was expelled from the Shooters, Fishers and Farmers Party in February 2019. He was reported to have had a falling out with the state committee over several issues, including his willingness to release confidential party business to the media, and an electoral funding bill Young had personally opposed but voted for due to party solidarity. In addition, Young had disagreed with his party's preference deals for the 2018 election, which he believed undermining his re-election chances in favour of successful Liberal Democrat candidate Tim Quilty.

In 2019, Young commenced work for a Liberal Party state MP as an electorate officer and has since joined the Liberal Party as a member.

References

External links
 Parliamentary voting record of Daniel Young at Victorian Parliament Tracker

1988 births
Living people
Members of the Victorian Legislative Council
Shooters, Fishers and Farmers Party politicians
Shooters, Fishers and Farmers Party Members of the Parliament of Victoria
21st-century Australian politicians